Diaphoranthema is a subgenus of the genus Tillandsia.

Species
Species accepted by Encyclopedia of Bromeliads as of October 2022:

Tillandsia aizoides 
Tillandsia andicola 
Tillandsia angulosa 
Tillandsia bandensis 
Tillandsia brealitoensis 
Tillandsia caliginosa 
Tillandsia capillaris 
Tillandsia castellanii 
Tillandsia copynii 
Tillandsia cotagaitensis 
Tillandsia crocata 
Tillandsia erecta 
Tillandsia funebris 
Tillandsia gilliesii 
Tillandsia hirta 
Tillandsia kuehhasii 
Tillandsia landbeckii 
Tillandsia loliacea 
Tillandsia minutiflora 
Tillandsia mollis 
Tillandsia myosura 
Tillandsia pedicellata 
Tillandsia porongoensis 
Tillandsia rectangula 
Tillandsia recurvata 
Tillandsia retorta 
Tillandsia spiralipetala 
Tillandsia tenebra 
Tillandsia tricholepis 
Tillandsia usneoides 
Tillandsia virescens

References

External links

Diaphoranthema
Plant subgenera